The Rolex Oyster Perpetual Date Sea-Dweller is a line of diver's watches manufactured by Rolex, with an underwater diving depth rating of 1,220 meters (4 000 ft)  and up to 3,900 metres (12,800 ft) for the Sea-Dweller Deepsea model.

Launched in 1967 with a diving depth of 610 metres (2 000 ft), the Sea-Dweller features a gas escape valve, developed by the brand specifically for watches, which allows the helium trapped in the watch while decompressing to be released at a given pressure during decompression, while preserving the watch case's water resistance. Today's Sea-Dweller models are available in steel or steel and yellow gold, and have a 43 mm case.

The Deepsea models come equipped with the brand's patented Ringlock system, which was designed to provide a higher degree of pressure resistance.

History
During the 1960s, the needs of professional divers working at great depths led to the development of the first 'ultra water resistant' tool watches designed for conducting safe diving operations at 300 m+ (1,000 ft+) depths.

The Rolex Sea-Dweller reference 1665 was developed in the second quarter of 1967 but became available to the public only in 1971. The delay was probably caused by issues with obtaining the patent for the helium escape valve. The first Sea-Dweller models made between April and June 1967 did not feature a helium release valve. In late 1967, an archeological diver named T. Walker Lloyd approached Rolex with the idea for the valve as watches used in saturation diving experienced problems during decompression. Helium atoms inside a pressure chamber can work their way inside a watch. During decompression, the pressure inside the chamber can decrease more rapidly than the pressure inside the watch case. This can, in some cases, cause the watch crystal to pop off. The helium-release valve allows helium to escape in a controlled way from the case during decompression preventing damage to the watch. The original idea for using a one-way valve came from Robert A. Barth, a US Navy diver who pioneered saturation diving during the US Navy Genesis and SEALAB missions led by Dr. George F. Bond. The very first valve prototype was given to Dr. Ralph Werner Brauer, a professor for physiology at Duke University and director of the Wrightsville Marine Biomedical Laboratory of the University of North Carolina Wilmington. Brauer tested the watch during a series of Physalie dives at the Comex Hyperbaric Center in Marseille, France. In the past, it was wrongly assumed the Sea-Dweller was developed in cooperation with Comex S.A. industrial deep-sea diving but the French company became a partner of Rolex only in late 1971.

Most of these non-valve watches were awarded to pioneers in underwater exploration like Robert Palmer Bradley, who was a pilot of Deepstar 4000. Other examples were given to Tektite habitat Aquanauts such as Ian Koblick or Richard Waller.

Most Sea-Dweller watches incorporate a helium escape valve for saturation diving. Early Sea-Dwellers, however, did not always have the valve. Until the 2017 introduction of the reference number 126600, Sea-Dweller's were also distinguished by the absence of the (plano-convex) date magnifying lens ("cyclops") present on most other Rolex models as it was impossible to attach a cyclops with Ultraviolet (UV) light curing adhesive at the top of a (domed) watch crystal exposed to the pressure encountered at its test depth. The Sea-Dweller diving watch range has been standard issue for Comex divers since 1977.

The Sea-Dweller Submariner 2000 watches have two red text lines on the watch dial, which led to an unofficial "Double Red" designation by watch collectors.

The last Comex Sea-Dweller 4000 Rolex reference number is 16600. It was the first Rolex toolwatch to receive a sapphire crystal, thicker case and an improved helium escape valve. This watch was issued to Comex divers since 1992. The watch was discontinued in 2008.

In 2014 Rolex re-introduced the Sea-Dweller with a new 116600 reference. This watch retained the historic 40mm case size but was updated with a cerachrom ceramic bezel and the new ‘Maxi dial’. The bracelet was updated with the new ‘glidelock extension’ system.

At the BaselWorld watch and jewellery show 2017, Rolex introduced an enlarged Sea-Dweller model featuring a date magnifier on a redesigned (flat) watch crystal and an updated automatic movement (Calibre 3235). Its reference number is 126600. The Rolex Sea-Dweller 126600 watch case has a diameter of  mm, 3.0 mm larger than previous generations of the Sea-Dweller.

Several semi-custom production runs of Sea-Dweller Submariner 2000 and 4000 models were produced with and without helium escape valves and differing watch dial patterns for the Comex S.A. company. These variants sometimes also had differing Rolex reference numbers. Some of these non-standard Sea-Dweller watches had the Comex S.A. logo depicted on the watch dial, which led to an unofficial "COMEX watches" designation by collectors. These watches were either issued to Comex staff members or were given as business gifts.

In 2019, Rolex introduced the first two-tone Sea-Dweller with reference 126603. Like the previous release, it has a  case and Caliber 3235 movement, but with the addition of gold accents.

Rolex Sea-Dweller Deepsea variant

At the BaselWorld watch and jewellery show 2008, Rolex introduced an updated Sea-Dweller model named the Rolex Oyster Perpetual Date Sea-Dweller Deepsea. Its reference number is 116660.

To test the water resistance of the Sea-Dweller DEEPSEA, Rolex uses testing equipment developed for them by Comex.
Normal surface air filled watch cases and crystals designed for extreme depths must be large to cope with the water pressure. 
Other features which came with the Deepsea at 2008 was the "Ringlock System" for sealing the sapphire crystal to the case, a caseback made of titanium/steel alloy, the "Glidelock-clasp" and diver extension link, "maxi-dial", engraved rehaut, ceramic bezel with platinum-filled numbers, calibre 3135 with antimagnetic Parachrome-Blue-hairspring and blue "Chromalight" loom.

The first variant of Sea-Dweller Deepsea reference 116660 has a classic black dial with white text on the dial.

A second "D-Blue"-variant was released in 2014 in honor of James Cameron and his journey to the deepest area of Earth's oceans in the year 2012. It has a blue/black dial and green colored "DEEPSEA"-label.

In 2018, the new Deepsea model reference 126660 was introduced at Baselworld. It was updated with the Calibre 3235, a broader bracelet, a resized folding clasp, and a slightly redesigned case.

Rolex Sea-Dweller Deepsea Challenge variant
This watch represented in its launch year the most water resistant mechanical watch in serial production.
The Deepsea Challenge model does not feature a date complication unlike the Deepsea and Sea-Dweller models, which were designed for saturation diving were people have to spend multiple days in pressurized environments.

Diving records

They wore Rolex Sea-Dwellers.

He took 43 days to complete the dive. The watch used during this scientific record dive, where a hydrogen-helium-oxygen (hydreliox) gas mixture was used as breathing gas, was a Rolex Sea-Dweller 16600 with a  depth rating. Rolex used this achievement in advertising campaigns.

The complexity, medical problems and physiological limits, such as those imposed by high pressure nervous syndrome, the accompanying high costs of professional saturation diving to extreme depths and the development of deep water atmospheric diving suits and remotely operated underwater vehicles in offshore oilfield drilling and production effectively ended the need for ever deeper, non-atmospheric manned intervention in the ocean. These practical factors make watch depth ratings of more than  marketing curiosities.

Experimental Sea-Dweller DEEPSEA CHALLENGE watch
In late March 2012, Rolex announced that a new prototype diving watch was developed and is part of the Rolex supported attempt to dive the DSV Deepsea Challenger to the bottom of the Challenger Deep, the deepest surveyed point in the oceans.
According to the pilot of the DSV Deepsea Challenger, James Cameron, the "Rolex Deepsea Challenge was the reliable companion throughout the dive; it was visible on the sub's manipulator arm and working precisely at 10,898 meters down at the bottom of the Challenger Deep."

Related pages 

 Rolex Daytona
 Rolex Day-Date
 Rolex Datejust
 Rolex GMT Master II
 Rolex Milgauss
 Rolex Submariner
 Rolex Yacht-Master

References

External links
Rolex Oyster Perpetual Date Sea-Dweller DEEPSEA CHALLENGE pictures
Perezcope – The History of the Rolex Sea-Dweller at a Glance
Review of Rolex Sea-Dweller 16600

Rolex watches
Products introduced in 1967